Sub is a common abbreviation of words beginning with the prefix "sub-".

Sub or SUB or variant, may also refer to

Places
 Juanda International Airport, Surabaya, Indonesia, IATA code SUB

People
 Bottom (BDSM), or "sub" for "submissive"
 Substitute teacher

Computing and technology
 <sub>, an HTML tag for subscript
 SUB designates a subroutine in some programming languages
 SUB, substitute character, ASCII character 26
 SUB, subtraction processor command
 .sub (disambiguation), several file extensions
 Subeditor
 Subwoofer loudspeaker

Typography
 Subscript and superscript
 Subtitle

Entertainment and media
 Sub (TV channel)
 Sub (album), a 2000 album by Swiss industrial metal band Apollyon Sun
 The Sub, a 2017 American short horror film
 Subs (film), a 2018 German film

Other uses
 Seafarers' Union of Burma, or SUB
 Submarine sandwich, or hero sandwich
 Submarine boat
 Submersible boat
 Subscription

See also

 Semisub
 Süß
 Substitute (disambiguation)
 Submarine (disambiguation)